Frederick Apartments may refer to:

Frederick Apartments (Columbia, Missouri)
Frederick Apartments (Charlotte, North Carolina)